Maya Mayavan is a 1938 Indian Tamil-language action thriller film directed by B. Sampathkumar and produced by T. R. Sundaram of Modern Theatres. It stars T. K. Sampangi, J. Susheela Devi, K. Kokila and G. R. Varadachar. It was released on 22 October 1938.

Plot 
Sabapathy Mudaliar, a wolf in sheep's clothing and womaniser, lusts for a young woman named Indira, and tries to make her his own by any means possible, despite already having a mistress who is a dancer named Sundari. Jagadish, a detective, decides to save Indira, with whom he becomes hopelessly enamored. The duo faces many obstacles made by Sabapathy and his partners in crime. But by utilising his investigator abilities, he prevails with regards to saving his lover and the two marry.

Cast 
Cast adapted from the film's songbook:

 T. K. Sampangi as Jagadish (Detective Officer)
 Miss K. Kokila as Indira
 Miss J. Susheela Devi as Sundari
 Miss Seetha Bai as Shantha & Female Dancer
 G. R. Varadachari as Sir Sabapathy Mudaliar
 K. Kaveri Chettiar as Diwan Bahadur Shivasankara Mudaliar
 Venugopala Sharma as Kittu
 Venu Chetti as Pattu
 Devaraju as Munusami
 V. V. S. Mani as Neliyan

Group of Bandits
 Anthonisami
 Deivadhanavel
 Somasundaran
 Lakshminarayanan
 Appavu Pillai

Production 
Maya Mayavan was produced by T. R. Sundaram under his Salem-based production company Modern Theatres. It was directed by B. Sampathkumar and written by S. Velsamy Kavi. The length of the film was 15500 feet.

Soundtrack 
The music of the film was composed by G. Rajagopal Naidu. S. Velusami wrote the lyrics. The singers were Miss K. Kokila, Miss J. Susheela Devi,  Venugopala Sharma, Venu Chetti, and T. K. Sampangi. P. G. Venkatesan, popularly known as the "Saigal of South India", worked as a playback singer on two of the songs.

Orchestra
 Rajagopal Naidu – Fiddle
 Ibrahim – Organ & Piano
 K. Rangaiah Naidu – Clarinet
 T. P. Chinaiah – Tabla

Release and reception 
Maya Mayavan was released on 22 October 1938. According to film historian Randor Guy, the film did "not leave much of an impact on viewers", but he said it would be remembered for "interesting storyline, exciting car chases on lonely highways, kidnappings and thrilling sequences, rarely seen in Tamil Cinema of that era."

References 

1930s action thriller films
1930s Tamil-language films
Films scored by G. Rajagopal Naidu
Indian action thriller films
Indian black-and-white films